William Albert Wright (15 August 1900 – 3 June 1983) was an Australian rules footballer who played with Richmond in the Victorian Football League (VFL).

Notes

External links 

1900 births
1983 deaths
Australian rules footballers from Victoria (Australia)
Richmond Football Club players